Jesse Huta Galung was the defending champion, but decided not to compete.

Andreas Beck won the title, defeating Grégoire Burquier in the final, 7–5, 6–3.

Seeds

Draw

Finals

Top half

Bottom half

References
 Main Draw
 Qualifying Draw

Open Harmonie mutuelle - Singles
2014 Singles